Ajey Nagar (born 12 June 1999), popularly known as CarryMinati, is an Indian YouTuber and streamer from Faridabad, India. He is known for his roasting videos, comedic skits and reactions to various online topics on his channel CarryMinati. His other channel CarryisLive is dedicated to gaming and live streams.

In May 2020, his roast video titled "YouTube vs TikTok - The End" caused controversy on YouTube India. The video was removed by YouTube for violations against the platform's terms of service, citing reasons such as cyberbullying and harassment.

Career 
Ajey Nagar is based in Faridabad, a city near India's national capital New Delhi. Popularly referred to as CarryMinati, Nagar is mainly involved in creating Hindi-language roasting and comedy videos, diss songs, satirical parodies, apart from live gaming. Nagar and his team produce videos out of his home in Faridabad.

Nagar began posting videos on YouTube at the age of 10. His main YouTube channel has been active since 2014. In 2014, the channel's name was AddictedA1 and Nagar would upload recorded video game footage along with his reactions to the game. In 2015, he changed the channel's name to CarryDeol, uploading gameplay footage of Counter-Strike: Global Offensive while mimicking Sunny Deol. The channel was subsequently renamed to CarryMinati. In May 2021, Nagar released a statement saying that the channel had more than 30 million subscribers.

In early 2017, Nagar created an additional YouTube channel called CarryIsLive, where he live-streams himself playing video games. He has hosted live-streams on this channel, raising funds for victims of cyclone Fani in Odisha in 2019, and the flooding in Assam and Bihar in 2020.

In 2019, Nagar was listed at the 10th position in the Next Generation Leaders' 2019 by Time magazine, which is an annual list of ten young people who construct innovative careers. In April 2020 he was part of Forbes 30 Under 30 Asia

He had a cameo appearance as himself in the 2022 movie Runway 34.

YouTube vs TikTok–The End 

In May 2020, Nagar published a controversial YouTube video titled "YouTube Vs TikTok–The End", in response to a video shared on Instagram by TikTok user Amir Siddiqui who berated YouTube creators for roasting TikTok users. It was taken down by YouTube citing violations of its terms of service, based on multiple complaints of harassment and cyberbullying. A large number reports had been made by LGBTQ+ activists, on account of homophobic or transphobic abusive language in the video. Many of Nagar's fans were critical of YouTube's actions, and the removal led to several new trending hashtags mentioning his name. As a result, the video received several million views, and there was a concerted effort to review bomb TikTok at Google Play Store. Other fans of Nagar spoke out in favor of YouTube's decision to remove the video. In June 2020, Nagar uploaded the music video "Yalgaar" as a further response, with renewed criticism of Siddiqui.

Discography

Singles and collaborations

Awards and recognition 
2019: Time 10 Next Generation Leaders #10
2020: Forbes 30 Under 30 Asia

See also 
 List of Indian YouTubers
 List of Indian comedians
 PewDiePie vs T-Series
 List of YouTubers

References

External links 

 
 
 
 

Living people
Indian YouTubers
People from Faridabad
Indian male comedians
Commentary YouTubers
Indian male musicians
Comedy YouTubers
Gaming YouTubers
Music YouTubers
1999 births
Comedy-related YouTube channels
Gaming-related YouTube channels
Charity fundraisers (people)
People from Haryana
People from Delhi